SurfCity Cable TV is a pay television operator based in Gisborne, New Zealand. The company retransmitts channels produced by SKY Network Television.

The company was set up in conjunction with PacSat Communications who operate a cable television network in Greymouth, New Zealand and was formerly known as PacSat Cable TV but changed its name in October 2001.

The company operates a mixture of cable television and microwave-based networks to deliver service in the Gisborne and Wainui.

External links
SurfCity Website.

Television networks in New Zealand
New Zealand subscription television services
Mass media in Gisborne, New Zealand